Kshitij English Boarding School (KEBS) is a private boarding school situated in the heart of Bhakteshwor Marga, Banepa-10, Kavrepalanchowk district. It was founded in 2006.

This school has been running from class Playgroup to class X. The school has been providing education to more than 800 students of Kavrepalanchowk district especially Banepa.

History
The founder of Kshitij School Mr. Govindala Pradhananga was the principal of Kavre Higher Secondary School. He was abandoned   and started this school with the support of Mr. Ramesh Prasad Sapkota, Ram kumar Gelal, Chandra Prasad Tajpuria, Thakur Dahal and members named as Rajan Prasad Sapkota, Upendra sapkota, Hari Krishna Timilsina, Purnima Pradhananga, Late Rama Badal, Bimala Sharma, and so on.

In 2014, Govindalal Pradhananga is the patron of the school and Mr. Harigopal Pradhananga is the chairperson of this school. Recently the founding principal, Mr. Ramesh Prasad Sapkota resigned from his post and Mr. Liladhar Paudyal has been appointed as the principal of this school.

School magazine
 Kshitij Deep - 2013, Kshitij School, Kavre

See also
 List of schools in Nepal
 School Leaving Certificate (Nepal)
 Education in Nepal

Bibliography
 Kshitij Deep, 2013, Kshitij School, Banepa, Nepal

References

Secondary schools in Nepal
Boarding schools in Nepal
Educational institutions established in 2006
Education in Kavrepalanchok District
2006 establishments in Nepal